Greece–Moldova relations are the bilateral relations between Greece and  Moldova. Greece is represented in Moldova through its embassy in Kyiv and an honorary consulate in Chișinău. Moldova is represented in Greece through its embassy in Athens, which opened in 2003.

History 
Greece and Moldova have established ties from the mid-20th century due to the large number of Greek residents in Moldova after they were expelled from Greece due to their communist tendencies.

Educational collaboration

There has been a soaring interest since 1992 in Moldova on the Greek language. Greek-language teaching is offered by three largest Moldovan higher education institutes. The department of Greek language and culture has been created as part of the Moldova State University since 1998. Teaching of the Greek language is considered as of paramount importance for the Greek community of Moldova. Greek Ministry of Education has been sending study materials for the students following Greek language courses but also scholarships for Aristotle University of Thessaloniki.

Transnistria
Greece plays an active role to ensure a peaceful solution to a Moldovan problem regarding Transnistria.

See also
 Foreign relations of Greece
 Foreign relations of Moldova 
 Moldovan Embassy, Athens
 Moldova–EU relations

References

External links
 Greek Ministry of Foreign Affairs about the relation with Moldova

 
Moldova
Greece